Salas de Pallars is a municipality in the comarca of the Pallars Jussà in Catalonia, Spain. It is about 8 km from Tremp and 5 km from Pobla de Segur. The town is served by the C-147 motorway.

References

External links
 Government data pages 

Municipalities in Pallars Jussà